Zsuzsa Ördög (born 16 April 1940) is a Hungarian former swimmer. She competed in the women's 100 metre freestyle at the 1956 Summer Olympics.

References

1940 births
Living people
Olympic swimmers of Hungary
Swimmers at the 1956 Summer Olympics
Swimmers from Budapest
Hungarian female freestyle swimmers